Lieutenant Colonel Rick Francona (born 31 August 1951) is an author, commentator and media military analyst. He is a retired United States Air Force intelligence officer with experience in the Middle East, including tours of duty with the National Security Agency, the Defense Intelligence Agency and the Central Intelligence Agency. He was under contract to NBC News and appeared regularly on NBC, MSNBC and CNBC, as well as Radio Canada and other media. In 2013, he became a military analyst with CNN.

Background
Francona served for over 27 years in the U.S. Air Force, most of it in the Middle East. Fluent in Arabic, he served in the region with the National Security Agency, the Defense Intelligence Agency and the Central Intelligence Agency. He has a bachelor's degree from Chapman College (now Chapman University) in Government and the Arabic language, and a master's degree from Troy State University in International Relations with a concentration in Middle East studies. He is a cousin of the current Cleveland Indians manager Terry Francona.

Francona and his wife Emily, also a retired Air Force intelligence officer, reside in Port Orford, Oregon.

Military service
Francona enlisted in the United States Air Force in 1970, and served as a Vietnamese linguist until 1973, conducting combat aerial reconnaissance missions over Vietnam and Laos in a variety of strategic and tactical aircraft. After Arabic language training, he served at a variety of locations in the Middle East from 1975 to 1977, and supported the evacuation of the U.S. Embassy in Beirut, Lebanon in 1976. In 1978, he became an Arabic language instructor at the Defense Language Institute in Monterey, California.

Following his commissioning in 1979, Francona was an instructor at the Air Force Intelligence School in Denver, Colorado. From 1982 to 1984, he was a Middle East operations officer with the National Security Agency in the United States and overseas. In 1984, he was assigned as an advisor to the Royal Jordanian Air Force in Amman, Jordan.

In 1987, he was assigned to the Defense Intelligence Agency as the assistant defense intelligence officer for the Middle East. During this assignment, he spent much of 1987 and 1988 at the U.S. Embassy in Baghdad, Iraq, as a liaison officer to the Iraqi armed forces Directorate of Military Intelligence. Francona worked an observer of Iraqi combat operations against Iranian forces, and flew sorties with the Iraqi Air Force. His observations were key to the discovery of Iraqi chemical weapons capabilities and ballistic missile modifications.
Immediately following the Iraqi invasion of Kuwait in August 1990 and through the Gulf War, Francona was deployed to the Gulf as an interpreter and advisor on Iraqi armed forces to commander in chief of the U.S. Central Command, General Norman Schwarzkopf, Jr. As such, he was the lead interpreter for ceasefire talks with the Iraqi military at Safwan, Iraq, in March 1991.

After the end of the Gulf War, Francona served in the Office of the Secretary of Defense, and was a principal author of the Department of Defense report to Congress on the conduct of the Gulf war. In 1992, he was selected to be the first air attaché to the U.S. Embassy in Damascus, Syria, returning to the United States in 1995.

From 1995 to 1996, Francona served with the Central Intelligence Agency, and participated in a variety of sensitive operations in the Middle East. During one of these operations, he survived an attempt on his life by Iraqi Intelligence Service agents. He was later awarded the CIA Bronze Seal Medallion for his service to the CIA.

In 1996, he was selected to lead the development of a Joint Services counterterrorism intelligence branch. As a direct result of the success in creating this special Task Force, he was asked to lead a special operations team supporting NATO forces in Bosnia in late 1997. He returned to the United States and retired from active duty in 1998.

His decorations include the Defense Distinguished Service Medal, the Defense Superior Service Medal, the Bronze Star, and nine Air Medals, as well as campaign awards for service in Vietnam, the Persian Gulf, and the Balkans. Francona was awarded the Central Intelligence Agency Seal Medallion for his service with that agency. In 2006, Francona was inducted into the Defense Language Institute Hall of Fame.

Commentary
Francona is a media analyst on Middle East political-military events, formerly under contract to NBC News and appeared regularly on NBC Nightly News, the Today Show, MSNBC, Hardball with Chris Matthews, Scarborough Country, Countdown with Keith Olbermann, and others. He also writes articles for MSNBC, the Council on Foreign Relations, and his blog at Middle East Perspectives. He frequently speaks to conventions and public service audiences.

In 2010, Francona appeared as a subject matter expert on the Iraqi military and Saddam Hussein in an episode of Spike TV's "Who is the Deadliest Warrior." In 2013, he began working as a military analyst for CNN, commenting on the Syrian civil war and chemical warfare issues, and in 2014 on the deteriorating situation in Iraq.

Pentagon military analyst program
In April 2008, documents obtained by New York Times reporter David Barstow revealed that Francona had been recruited as one of over 75 retired military officers involved in the Pentagon military analyst program. Participants appeared on television and radio news shows as military analysts, and/or penned newspaper op-ed columns. The program was launched in early 2002 by then-Assistant Secretary of Defense for Public Affairs Victoria Clarke. The idea was to recruit "key influentials" to help sell a wary public on "a possible Iraq invasion."

References

External links
 Ally to Adversary: An Eyewitness Account of Iraq's Fall from Grace, Naval Institute Press, Annapolis, MD, 1999; .  Cited as one of the top ten regional books of the year by The Oregonian newspaper.
 Chasing Demons: My Hunt for War Criminals in Bosnia, Francona Advisors, Monterey, CA, 2012.
 

1951 births
Living people
United States Air Force officers
United States Air Force personnel of the Gulf War
United States Air Force personnel of the Vietnam War
American foreign policy writers
American male non-fiction writers
People of the Defense Intelligence Agency
People of the Central Intelligence Agency
National Security Agency people
American writers of Italian descent
American broadcast news analysts
Chapman University alumni
Writers from Oregon
Defense Language Institute faculty
Recipients of the Air Medal
Recipients of the Defense Superior Service Medal
Recipients of the Defense Distinguished Service Medal
People from New Brighton, Pennsylvania
Port Orford, Oregon
20th-century American male writers
Military personnel from Pennsylvania